Peace Church, also known as Die Frieden Kirche, is an historic Reformed and Lutheran church located in Hampden Township, Cumberland County, Pennsylvania.  It was built about 1798 by a Reformed congregation, and is a -story limestone building with a five-bay front and three-bay sides. In 1806 the local Lutheran congregation was invited "in peace" to share the building for services. The interior features a wine glass pulpit, balcony around three sides, and organ built in 1807. Its builder, Martin Rupp, also built the Johannes Eberly House.

It was added to the National Register of Historic Places in 1972.

References

External links
Historic Peace Church website

Churches on the National Register of Historic Places in Pennsylvania
Lutheran churches in Pennsylvania
Churches completed in 1798
Churches in Cumberland County, Pennsylvania
18th-century Lutheran churches in the United States
National Register of Historic Places in Cumberland County, Pennsylvania